Michael Elko (born July 28, 1977) is an American college football coach who is currently the head coach at Duke University. He was previously the defensive coordinator for Texas A&M from 2018 until his hiring by Duke on December 10, 2021.

Early life 
Raised in South Brunswick, New Jersey, Elko graduated in 1995 from South Brunswick High School, where he played baseball, basketball and was the quarterback for the school's football team. He was recognized by the coaches of the Greater Middlesex Conference as the league's top quarterback in 1994 and was inducted into the school's athletic hall of fame in 2012. He graduated from the University of Pennsylvania, where he played for the Penn Quakers football team that won the Ivy league championship in 1998.

Career 
Prior to being named defensive coordinator at Notre Dame, Elko had coached under Dave Clawson for 12 seasons. He spent two seasons with Clawson at both Fordham and Richmond, five seasons with him at Bowling Green,  and three seasons with Clawson at Wake Forest. During the 2016 season, Elko's Wake Forest defense ranked in the top 20 for NCAA Division I Football Bowl Subdivision (FBS) in defensive touchdowns scored, turnovers, red zone defense, sacks, and scoring defense. Alabama, Clemson and Washington, the three other FBS teams to accomplish this on defense, were among the four teams selected to compete in that season's College Football Playoff postseason tournament. The Fighting Irish fired DC Brian VanGorder the prior September after Notre Dame started the season with a 1–3 record and a defense ranked third from the bottom of the FBS. On January 4, 2018, Elko was hired by Jimbo Fisher as the defensive coordinator at Texas A&M inking a three-year deal averaging $1.8M/year.

Head coaching record

Statistics as defensive coordinator

References

External links
 Duke profile
 Texas A&M profile

1977 births
Living people
American football safeties
Bowling Green Falcons football coaches
Duke Blue Devils football coaches
Fordham Rams football coaches
Hofstra Pride football coaches
Merchant Marine Mariners football coaches
Notre Dame Fighting Irish football coaches
Penn Quakers football players
Penn Quakers football coaches
Richmond Spiders football coaches
Stony Brook Seawolves football coaches
Texas A&M Aggies football coaches
Wake Forest Demon Deacons football coaches
South Brunswick High School (New Jersey) alumni
People from South Brunswick, New Jersey
Coaches of American football from New Jersey
Players of American football from New Jersey